Ruthven Road railway station served Ruthven House and the village of Ruthvenfield in Perthshire, Scotland, from 1859 to 1951 on the Perth, Almond Valley and Methven Railway.

History 
The station opened as Ruthven Road Crossing in May 1859 by the Perth, Almond Valley and Methven Railway. Its name was changed to Ruthven Road in December 1938. It closed on 1 October 1951.

References

External links 

Disused railway stations in Perth and Kinross
Railway stations in Great Britain opened in 1859
Railway stations in Great Britain closed in 1951
1859 establishments in Scotland
1951 disestablishments in Scotland